Sylvie Bornet (born January 21, 1960) is a French marathoner who also ran cross-country and middle-distance during her career. In 1987, Bornet won the Twin Cities Marathon, finishing with a time of 2:30:11. She went on to win the Twin Cities Marathon again in 1990 with her personal best time of 2:29:22.

Running career

Sylvie began her running career at the age of 18. On June 11, 1978, she won second place in at a 3000 m race in Brussels, Belgium with a time of 9:38.94. During the 1984 Avon Marathon in Paris, Bornet came in 12th with a time of 2:39:18, winning $1,750. 
Bornet’s marathon run at the 1985 Universiade competition earned France a gold medal, despite the run being the slowest of her career (2:48:11).  During the 1986 London Marathon, Bornet won $10,000 dollars after coming in fourth place in a time of 2:31:43.

In 1987, Bornet placed third at the Houston Marathon, winning $8,000 in a time of 2:37:48. On Oct. 11, 1987, she was the first to cross the finish at the Twin Cities Marathon, winning $25,000 in a time of 2:30:11. Bornet won the Twin Cities Marathon again in 1990 with a career record time of 2:29:22.

At the 1992 Paris Marathon, Bornet took second place with a time of 2:32:24, winning $16,200. She ran the last marathon of her career on Jan. 31, 1993 at the Osaka Women’s International Marathon, ending in 17th place with a 2:43:25 run. Her career earnings amount to $93,850.

Achievements

1978 Brussels Marathon 2nd place 9:38:94
1984 Avon Marathon 12th place 2:39:18
1985 World Athletics Indoor Championships 14th place 2:40:31
1985 World Athletics Indoor Championships 3rd place 2:48:11
1986 London Marathon 4th place 2:31:43
1987 Houston Marathon 3rd place 2:37:48
1987 Twin Cities Marathon 1st place 2:30:11
1990 Twin Cities Marathon 1st place 2:29:22
1992 Paris Marathon 2nd place 2:32:24
1993 Osaka International Women’s Marathon 17th place, 2:43:25

References

External links
Sylvie Bornet at FFA
Sylvie Bornet at World Athletics
Sylvie Bornet at AARS

French female marathon runners
1960 births
Living people
Universiade medalists in athletics (track and field)
Medalists at the 1985 Summer Universiade
Universiade bronze medalists for France